The following is a list of players who have appeared at least in one game for the Air21 Express PBA franchise.

Players 

|-
| align=left| || align=left| || C || align=left| || 1 ||  || 2 || 8 || 4 || 1 || 0 || 
|-
| align=left| || align=left| || F || align=left| || 1 ||  || 9 || 231 || 127 || 56 || 7 || 
|-
| align=left| || align=left| || F || align=left| || 1 ||  || 16 || 118 || 26 || 28 || 6 || 
|-
| align=left| || align=left| || G || align=left| || 3 || –|| 54 || 1,153 || 247 || 152 || 113 || 
|-
| align=left| || align=left| || G || align=left| || 2 || – || 45 || 620 || 110 || 60 || 71 || 
|-
| align=left| || align=left| || C || align=left| || 1 ||  || 30 || 493 || 115 || 98 || 26 || 
|-
| align=left| || align=left| || G|| align=left| || 1 ||  || 6 || 51 || 7 || 3 || 6 || 
|-
| align=left| || align=left| || F || align=left| || 1 ||  || 27 || 485 || 115 || 90 || 11 || 
|-
| align=left| || align=left| || F/C || align=left| || 1 || – || 33 || 244 || 36 || 44 || 7 || 
|-
| align=left| || align=left| || F || align=left| || 1 ||  || 35 || 382 || 124 || 121 || 7 || 
|-
| align=left| || align=left| || F || align=left| || 1 ||  || 10 || 128 || 26 || 15 || 5 || 
|-
| align=left| || align=left| || F || align=left| || 2 || – || 71 || 1,675 || 866 || 289 || 67 ||
|-
| align=left| || align=left| || G || align=left| || 1 || – || 37 || 865 || 365 || 112 || 40 || 
|-
| align=left| || align=left| || G || align=left| || 1 ||  || 27 || 851 || 307 || 129 || 142 || 
|-
| align=left| || align=left| || G || align=left| || 2 || – || 35 || 733 || 220 || 106 || 78 || 
|-
| align=left| || align=left| || F || align=left| || 1 ||  || 15 || 112 || 45 || 29 || 3 || 
|-
| bgcolor="#FFCC00" align=left|+ || align=left| || C || align=left| || 1 ||  || 9 || 378 || 183 || 183 || 34 || 
|-
| align=left| || align=left| || G || align=left| || 1 ||  || 23 || 521 || 208 || 81 || 42 || 
|-
| bgcolor="#FFCC00" align=left|+ || align=left| || C || align=left| || 1 ||  || 15 || 636 || 358 || 231 || 49 || 
|-
| align=left| || align=left| || G || align=left| || 1 ||  || 10 || 74 || 22 || 7 || 3 || 
|-
| align=left| || align=left| || F || align=left| || 2 ||  || 20 || 281 || 76 || 50 || 19 || 
|-
| align=left| || align=left| || F/C || align=left| || 1 ||  || 8 || 100 || 22 || 17 || 2 || 
|-
| bgcolor="#FFCC00" align=left|+ || align=left| || SG/SF || align=left| || 2 ||  || 17 || 755 || 544 || 191 || 55 || 
|-
| align=left| || align=left| || G || align=left| || 1 ||  || 9 || 219 || 30 || 30 || 28 || 
|-
| align=left| || align=left| || F/C || align=left| || 1 ||  || 2 || 11 || 0 || 6 || 0 || 
|-
| align=left| || align=left| || F || align=left| || 2 ||– || 44 || 1,050 || 375 || 214 || 41 || 
|-
| align=left| || align=left| || F || align=left| || 1 || || 18 || 127 || 37 || 28 || 3 || 
|-
| bgcolor="#FFCC00" align=left|+ || align=left| || F/C || align=left|Rutgers || 1 ||  || 4 || 167 || 80 || 48 || 12 || 
|-
| align=left| || align=left| || F || align=left| || 2 || – || 23 || 487 || 194 || 121 || 16 || 
|-
| align=left| || align=left| || F || align=left| || 1 ||  || 11 || 86 || 25 || 15 || 2 || 
|-
| align=left| || align=left| || SG || align=left| || 3 || – || 40 || 415 || 95 || 40 || 16 || 
|-
| align=left| || align=left| || F || align=left| || 1 ||  || 15 || 188 || 65 || 36 || 9 || 
|-
| align=left| || align=left| || F || align=left| || 2 || – || 43 || 784 || 236 || 143 || 28 || 
|-
| align=left| || align=left| || G || align=left| || 1 || || 22 || 300 || 100 || 33 || 17 || 
|-
| align=left| || align=left| || F || align=left| || 1 ||  || 24 || 559 || 168 || 92 || 9 || 
|-
| align=left| || align=left| || G || align=left| || 3 || – || 49 || 622 || 200 || 48 || 37 || 
|-
| align=left| || align=left| || F/C || align=left| || 1 ||  || 15 || 235 || 69 || 66 || 12 || 
|-
| align=left| || align=left| || G || align=left| || 2 || – || 6 || 53 || 9 || 4 || 1 || 
|-
| align=left| || align=left| || F/C || align=left| || 2 || – || 25 || 252 || 88 || 63 || 3 || 
|-
| align=left| || align=left| || C || align=left| || 1 ||  || 9 || 102 || 18 || 32 || 0 || 
|-
| bgcolor="#FFCC00" align=left|+ || align=left| || F || align=left| || 2 ||  || 10 || 423 || 260 || 154 || 34 || 
|-
| align=left| || align=left| || C || align=left| || 1 ||  || 7 || 137 || 29 || 47 || 9 || 
|-
| align=left| || align=left| || C || align=left| || 2 || – || 43 || 1,617 || 618 || 533 || 92 || 
|-
| align=left| || align=left| || F/C || align=left| || 1 ||  || 6 || 26 || 2 || 1 || 1 || 
|-
| align=left| || align=left| || G || align=left| || 1 ||  || 26 || 511 || 115 || 53 || 63 || 
|-
| bgcolor="#FFCC00" align=left|+ || align=left| || G/F || align=left| || 1 ||  || 12 || 522 || 295 || 105 || 34 || 
|-
| align=left| || align=left| || G || align=left| || 1 ||  || 29 || 510 || 216 || 93 || 35 || 
|-
| align=left| || align=left| || G || align=left| || 2 || – || 43 || 1,302 || 529 || 189 || 82 || 
|}

References